Herbert Septimus Uber (1885-1969), was a male badminton player from England.

Badminton career
Uber born in Lambeth  was a four times winner of the All England Open Badminton Championships. He won the men's doubles in 1925 and then won three more titles in the mixed doubles.

He gained his England caps while playing for Surrey.

He was part of the English touring team that visited Canada during 1930. A match was held at the Granite Club in Toronto which England won 7-2.

Family
His mixed doubles title were won with his wife Betty Uber (née Corbin) whom he married in 1925, the name Uber is synonymous with badminton because of the Uber Cup.

References

English male badminton players
1885 births
1969 deaths